WGHN may refer to:

 WGHN (AM), a radio station on 1370 kHz licensed to Grand Haven, Michigan, United States.
 WGHN-FM, a radio station on 92.1 MHz licensed to Grand Haven.